Malina is a female given name. It may refer to:

 Malina (Bulgarian singer) (born 1967), Bulgarian singer
 Malina Joshi (born 1989), Nepali actress
 Malina Moye (born 1984), American singer-songwriter
 Malina Popivanova (1902–1954), Macedonian communist
 Malina Suliman (born 1990), Afghan artist
 Malina Weissman (born 2003), American actress and model

See also
 
 Malina (surname)
 Mălina (name), Romanian given name